Newhey (archaically New Hey) is a village near the town of Milnrow in the Metropolitan Borough of Rochdale, in Greater Manchester, England.

Historically a part of Lancashire, Newhey was anciently a hamlet within the township of Butterworth.  It was described in 1828 as "consisting of several ranges of cottages and two public houses". In the early 19th century a major road was built through Newhey from Werneth to Littleborough. Newhey was incorporated into the Milnrow Urban District in 1894.

Newhey expanded as part of an unplanned process of urbanisation, brought on by the introduction of textile manufacture during the Industrial Revolution, and is now home to the Ellenroad Steam Museum - the engine house of the former Ellenroad Ring Mill, the rest of which was demolished in 1985. It holds the world's largest working steam engine.

History

Lying by the older localities of Milnrow, Ogden and Haugh, Newhey is thought to have acquired its name as a result of land reclamation.

Newhey was home to the Newhey Brick and Terracotta Co. Ltd., a prosperous brick and tile works which opened on Huddersfield Road in 1899. Its bricks are found in buildings worldwide. Most mills and associated terraced houses in the Rochdale and Oldham areas were built from this "Newhey brick".

In the 1920s, Newhey had at least five cotton mills, including Ellenroad, Newhey, Coral, Haugh and Garfield (demolished 1969).

Governance
From a very early time, Newhey was part of the Butterworth township of Rochdale parish, in the Hundred of Salfordshire.

From 1894 to 1974, Newhey was part of Milnrow Urban District in the administrative county of Lancashire. In the local government reforms of 1974, this urban district status was abolished and Newhey is now part of the Metropolitan Borough of Rochdale.

Newhey was previously part of the Littleborough and Saddleworth constituency. It is now represented in the House of Commons as part of the parliamentary constituency of Rochdale.

Geography

The housing estate south of Newhey Road and east of Bentgate Street is known as Bentgate.

Localities in and around Newhey include Haugh and Woodbottom. Several reservoirs lie above and to the east, including Ogden, Kitcliffe and Piethorne.

Landmarks

Milnrow War Memorial, a Grade II listed structure, is in Newhey's Memorial Park. Originally in central Milnrow (set back from the road near Milnrow Bridge), it was unveiled in 1924 by Major General A Solly-Flood, a former commander of 42nd (East Lancashire) Division. Sculpted from Sandstone by G Thomas in 1923, the memorial is surmounted by a bronze statue of a First World War infantry soldier with rifle and fixed bayonet, symbolic of the district's young manhood in early First World War. The plinth has bronze and slate panels which show the names of local men who died in the two World Wars.

Ellenroad Engine House was designed by Sir Philip Stott, 1st Baronet. Its tall chimney makes it a local landmark.

Newhey parish church, dedicated to St. Thomas, was built in 1876 to serve the new Anglican parish of Newhey. Its patron is the Bishop of Manchester. The church was badly damaged by arson on 21 December 2007.

Transport
Newhey is served by the M62 motorway and Newhey Metrolink station.
Bus Services 182 and R5 serve Oldham, Manchester, Milnrow and Rochdale, operated by First Greater Manchester and Burnley Bus Company

See also

Listed buildings in Milnrow

References

Bibliography

External links

Ellenroad Engine House Tourist attraction home page
Newhey Community Primary School School Home Page
St Thomas Church, Newhey Church Home Page
St Thomas School, Newhey School Home Page

Areas of the Metropolitan Borough of Rochdale
Villages in Greater Manchester